GKHS may refer to:

Genoa-Kingston High School
Grace King High School
Graham-Kapowsin High School